The Theatre Arts Guild (TAG) of Halifax, Nova Scotia, is Canada's oldest continuously operated community theatre.  In 1931 the Little Theatre Movement and the Halifax Dramatic and Musical Club merged to found the TAG. The first director was Sidney Culverwell Oland.  TAG's mandate in its Act of Incorporation is "to promote the study, practice and knowledge of the dramatic and musical arts in the city of Halifax and the neighbourhood".

A.A. Milne's The Dover Road was the group's first production in May 1931 at the Garrick Theatre (now the Neptune Theatre).

During World War II, rather than plays, the focus was concert parties for the troops before their deployment overseas.

TAG has had several homes including the Capitol Theatre, the former College Street School, and the gymnasiums of HMCS Scotian and St. Patrick's High School. In 1966, TAG purchased and renovated a former church hall at 6 Parkhill Road as a permanent home and named it "The Pond Playhouse".  A major expansion was begun in 2005.

TAG's season runs from September through July.  Five shows are presented of all types: musicals, comedies, mysteries and dramas, plus an ever-popular Christmas pantomime.   Other activities include workshops, poetry readings and an annual members' Variety Night.

See also
 Culture of the Halifax Regional Municipality

References
 "About TAG" retrieved August 27, 2006

External links
 
 The Archives of the Theatre Arts Guild are held at Dalhousie University
 Recorded memory of theatre life in Nova Scotia Project

Theatre companies in Nova Scotia
Culture of Halifax, Nova Scotia
Tourist attractions in Halifax County, Nova Scotia